The Icelandic Handball Association ( or HSÍ) is the national governing body for handball in Iceland. It is based in Reykjavík.

Club handball 
The federation organizes the national handball leagues for both men and women club teams and the Icelandic cup for men and women.

International handball 
Iceland was the host of the 1995 World Men's Handball Championship.

The men's team
The men's team has appeared frequently in large tournaments in recent decades. Their best overall result is the silver medal at the 2008 Summer Olympics. Their best result in the world championship is 5th place in 1997. They have made it to the semi finals of the European Men's Handball Championship twice, winning the bronze medal in 2010. 
Head coach for the men's national team is Guðmundur Guðmundsson.

The women's team
The women's team has just recently started to appear in large tournaments. They have made it to the world championship once, finishing in 12th place in 2011. They have appeared in the European championship twice, finishing in 15th place in both 2010 and 2012.  The team has never made it to the Olympic games.
Head coach for the women's national team is Ágúst Þór Jóhannsson.

References

External links 
  

Handball in Iceland
Iceland
Handball